Clancy is both a given name and a surname, of Irish origin

Clancy may also refer to:

Fictional works
 Clancy Lowered the Boom, a song written by Hy Heath and Johnny Lange
 Clancy of the Overflow, a poem by Banjo Paterson
 Clancy of the Mounted
 The Overflow of Clancy, a poem written under the pseudonym of H.H.C.C.

Music
 Clancy (band), British pub-rock band
 The Clancy Brothers, Irish folk music singing group

Places
 Clancy, Montana

Other
 Clancy's, a restaurant in New Orleans
 Clancy's Fish Pub, a chain of restaurants in Western Australia.